Scotts Flat Reservoir is an artificial lake in the Tahoe National Forest of Nevada County, California,  east of Nevada City. Amenities consist of two launch ramps, a marina, campsites, a picnic area, sandy beaches, and a general store.

The earthen rock-fill Scotts Flat Dam dates from 1948 and impounds Deer Creek to create the reservoir with a capacity of 49,000 acre-feet.  At 175 feet above streambed, the dam is owned and operated by the county-level Nevada Irrigation District.

See also
List of lakes in California

References

External links

Reservoirs in Nevada County, California
Lakes of the Sierra Nevada (United States)
Tahoe National Forest
Dams in California
Dams in the Sacramento River basin
United States local public utility dams
Campgrounds in California
Tourist attractions in Nevada County, California
1948 establishments in California
Dams completed in 1948
Reservoirs in California